The Easter Cup is a greyhound racing competition held annually at Shelbourne Park in Dublin.

It was inaugurated in 1928.

The event was won by the great Spanish Battleship on twice in 1954 and 1955.

In 2017 the event was postponed following protests by the DGOBA which resulted in a suspension of racing at Shelbourne Park for five months. The protest was over the February closure of Harold's Cross Stadium. The 2020 edition was behind closed doors because of the COVID-19 pandemic.

Past winners

Venues and distances
1928–2007 (Shelbourne Park 525y) 
2008–present (Shelbourne Park 550y)
2017 (not held)

Sponsors
2004–2007 (Donal Reilly)
2009–2009 (BCR Print Management)
2010–2013 (College Causeway/Killahan Phanter)
2014–2015 (Dandelion Bar & Nightclub)
2016–2021 (Ladbrokes)
2022–present (Bresbet)

References

Greyhound racing competitions in Dublin (city)
Recurring sporting events established in 1928
1928 establishments in Ireland